Plavno is a village in Croatia, in the municipality of Knin, Šibenik-Knin County.

Demographics
According to the 2011 census, the village of Plavno has 253 inhabitants. This represents 14.71% of its pre-war population according to the 1991 census.

The 1991 census recorded that 99.30% of the village population were ethnic Serbs (1708/1720), 0.18% were Yugoslavs (3/1720) and 0.52% were of other ethnic origin (9/1720).

References

External links
  Plavno

Populated places in Šibenik-Knin County
Knin
Serb communities in Croatia